Aleksandr Ivanovich Shumeyko (born in USSR, died 16 May 2014 in Bishkek, Kyrgyzstan) was a Soviet and Kyrgyzstani professional football manager.

Career
Aleksandr Shumeyko during his long football life has worked as coach of Kyrgyzstan national under-21 football team, led the Alga-PVO Bishkek and SKA-PVO Bishkek and many others' football clubs. In recent years, Shumeyko worked as an inspector at the Top League matches, and he was Deputy Chairman of the Disciplinary Committee FFKR.

References

Year of birth missing
2014 deaths
Kyrgyzstani football managers
Soviet football managers
FC Alga Bishkek managers
Place of birth missing
Sportspeople from Bishkek